An aviary is a large enclosure for confining birds.

Aviary may also refer to:

 Aviary (album), a 2018 album by Julia Holter
 Aviary (Lynchburg, Virginia)
 Aviary (image editor), a photo-editing software for iOS, Android, and the web.
 National Aviary
 The Aviary, a 2005 film.
 The Aviary (group), a research group.
 The Aviary (album)